The Möhne is a river in North Rhine-Westphalia, Germany. It is a right tributary of the Ruhr. The Möhne passes the towns of Brilon, Rüthen and Warstein. There is a large artificial lake near the mouth of the river, the Möhne Reservoir, used for hydro power generation and leisure activities.

References

External links 
 

Rivers of North Rhine-Westphalia
 
Rivers of Germany